Troitsky is a rural locality (a settlement) in Alexandrovskoye Rural Settlement, Talovsky District, Voronezh Oblast, Russia. The population was 384 as of 2010. There are 6 streets.

Geography 
It is located 13 km north from Talovaya.

References 

Rural localities in Talovsky District